Patton Mansion is a historic home located at Charlottesville, Virginia. It was built in 1907, and is a two-story, five-bay, double pile, Jeffersonian Revival Style brick dwelling. It has a hipped roof and a full-height Tuscan order portico covering the center three bays of the front facade. There is a small hanging balcony with Chinese Chippendale balustrade above the entrance.

It was listed on the National Register of Historic Places in 1982.

References

Houses on the National Register of Historic Places in Virginia
Houses completed in 1907
Houses in Charlottesville, Virginia
National Register of Historic Places in Charlottesville, Virginia
Jeffersonian Revival architecture